Paul Vincent "Pitchin' Paul" Governali (January 5, 1921 – February 14, 1978) was a professional American football quarterback in the National Football League. An All-American at Columbia University, he was the 1942 recipient of the Maxwell Award for College Player of the Year and the first runner-up for the Heisman Trophy. At quarterback, he passed for 1,442 yards in nine games that season, threw 19 passes for touchdowns, and completed 52 percent of his passes, all new collegiate records. He was also among the leading punters in the nation. He still holds the Columbia record for touchdown passes in one game (five).

After graduating in 1943, he passed up offers from both professional baseball and football teams to enlist in the US Marines, where he served for three years.

He went on to play for the National Football League's Boston Yanks and New York Giants (1946-1948).

After a lackluster 1948 season, Governali retired from professional football and returned to Columbia, where he worked as an assistant coach while pursuing his doctorate in education, which he received in 1951.

He returned to coaching football at San Diego State University for five years from 1956 to 1960. The Aztecs had a lackluster record during those years and Governali was succeeded by Don Coryell, who led them to their best years.

Governali was inducted into the College Football Hall of Fame in 1986.

Paul Governali also had a minor stint as an actor, portraying a professional football player in the 1948 movie titled, "Triple Threat."

Paul Governali was married to Edna Governali with whom they had 4 children: Paul, Jeannie, Nicole, and Sam.

Head coaching record

See also
 List of NCAA major college football yearly passing leaders

References

External links
 
 

1921 births
1978 deaths
American football quarterbacks
Boston Yanks players
Columbia Lions football coaches
Columbia Lions football players
Maxwell Award winners
New York Giants players
San Diego State Aztecs football coaches
All-American college football players
College Football Hall of Fame inductees
Sportspeople from the Bronx
Players of American football from New York City
United States Marine Corps personnel of World War II